Clathria is a large genus of demosponges in the family Microcionidae.

Taxonomy
Clathria was first formally named in Eduard Oscar Schmidt's 1862 Die Spongien des adriatischen Meeres ("The sponges of the Adriatic Sea"). The type species is Clathria (Clathria) compressa.

The genus is divided into several subgenera:
 Clathria (Axosuberites) Topsent, 1893
 Clathria (Clathria) Schmidt, 1862
 Clathria (Cornulotrocha) Hallmann, 1920
 Clathria (Dendrocia) Topsent, 1927
 Clathria (Isociella) Hallmann, 1920
 Clathria (Microciona) Bowerbank, 1862
 Clathria (Paresperia) Burton, 1930
 Clathria (Thalysias) Duchassaing & Michelotti, 1864
 Clathria (Wilsonella) Carter, 1885

Species
The following species are recognised in the genus Clathria:

Subgenus Clathria (Axosuberites) Topsent, 1893
 Clathria (Axosuberites) aurantia Annunziata, Cavalcanti, Santos & Pinheiro, 2019
 Clathria (Axosuberites) benguelaensis Samaai & Gibbons, 2005
 Clathria (Axosuberites) canaliculata (Whitelegge, 1906)
 Clathria (Axosuberites) cylindrica (Ridley & Dendy, 1886)
 Clathria (Axosuberites) fauroti (Topsent, 1893)
 Clathria (Axosuberites) flabellata (Topsent, 1916)
 Clathria (Axosuberites) fromontae Hooper, 1996
 Clathria (Axosuberites) georgiaensis Hooper, 1996
 Clathria (Axosuberites) hillenburgi Annunziata, Cavalcanti, Santos & Pinheiro, 2019
 Clathria (Axosuberites) lambei (Koltun, 1955)
 Clathria (Axosuberites) macrotoxa (Bergquist & Fromont, 1988)
 Clathria (Axosuberites) marplatensis (Cuartas, 1992)
 Clathria (Axosuberites) multitoxaformis (Bergquist & Fromont, 1988)
 Clathria (Axosuberites) nidificata (Kirkpatrick, 1907)
 Clathria (Axosuberites) pachyaxia (Lévi, 1960)
 Clathria (Axosuberites) papillata Van Soest, Beglinger & De Voogd, 2013
 Clathria (Axosuberites) patula (Hooper, 1996)
 Clathria (Axosuberites) ramea (Koltun, 1964)
 Clathria (Axosuberites) retamalesi Fernandez, Bravo-Gómez, Cárdenas & Hajdu, 2020
 Clathria (Axosuberites) riosae Van Soest, 2017
 Clathria (Axosuberites) rosita Goodwin, Brewin & Brickle, 2012
 Clathria (Axosuberites) thetidis (Hallmann, 1920)
Subgenus Clathria (Clathria) Schmidt, 1862
 Clathria (Clathria) acanthostyli (Hoshino, 1981)
 Clathria (Clathria) acanthotoxa (Stephens, 1916)
 Clathria (Clathria) angulifera Dendy, 1896
 Clathria (Clathria) anthoides Lévi, 1993
 Clathria (Clathria) antyaja (Burton & Rao, 1932)
 Clathria (Clathria) arbuscula (Row, 1911)
 Clathria (Clathria) arcifera (Schmidt, 1868)
 Clathria (Clathria) arcuophora Whitelegge, 1907
 Clathria (Clathria) arroyoi Uriz, 1984
 Clathria (Clathria) asodes (de Laubenfels, 1930)
 Clathria (Clathria) axociona Lévi, 1963
 Clathria (Clathria) barleei (Bowerbank, 1866)
 Clathria (Clathria) basilana Lévi, 1961
 Clathria (Clathria) bergquistae Van Soest & Hooper, 2020
 Clathria (Clathria) biclathrata Hooper in Hooper & Wiedenmayer, 1994
 Clathria (Clathria) borealis Hooper, 1996
 Clathria (Clathria) bulbosa Hooper & Lévi, 1993
 Clathria (Clathria) burtoni Cuartas, 1995
 Clathria (Clathria) caelata Hallmann, 1912
 Clathria (Clathria) calopora Whitelegge, 1907
 Clathria (Clathria) calypso Boury-Esnault, 1973
 Clathria (Clathria) carteri Topsent, 1889
 Clathria (Clathria) chelifera (Hentschel, 1911)
 Clathria (Clathria) compressa Schmidt, 1862
 Clathria (Clathria) conectens (Hallmann, 1912)
 Clathria (Clathria) conica Lévi, 1963
 Clathria (Clathria) contorta (Bergquist & Fromont, 1988)
 Clathria (Clathria) coralloides (Scopoli, 1772)
 Clathria (Clathria) crassa (Lendenfeld, 1887)
 Clathria (Clathria) dayi Lévi, 1963
 Clathria (Clathria) decumbens Ridley, 1884
 Clathria (Clathria) depressa Sarà & Melone, 1966
 Clathria (Clathria) discreta (Thiele, 1905)
 Clathria (Clathria) echinonematissima (Carter, 1887)
 Clathria (Clathria) elastica Lévi, 1963
 Clathria (Clathria) elegans Vosmaer, 1880
 Clathria (Clathria) faviformis Lehnert & van Soest, 1996
 Clathria (Clathria) foliacea Topsent, 1889
 Clathria (Clathria) foliascens Vacelet & Vasseur, 1971
 Clathria (Clathria) frondiculata (Schmidt, 1864)
 Clathria (Clathria) gageoensis Kim & Sim, 2005
 Clathria (Clathria) gombawuiensis Kim & Sim, 2005
 Clathria (Clathria) gomezae Van Soest, 2017
 Clathria (Clathria) gorgonioides (Dendy, 1916)
 Clathria (Clathria) hexagonopora Lévi, 1963
 Clathria (Clathria) hispidula (Ridley, 1884)
 Clathria (Clathria) hjorti (Arnesen, 1920)
 Clathria (Clathria) hongdoensis Kim & Sim, 2006
 Clathria (Clathria) horrida (Row, 1911)
 Clathria (Clathria) ieoensis Kang & Kim, 2018
 Clathria (Clathria) inanchorata Ridley & Dendy, 1886
 Clathria (Clathria) indica Dendy, 1889
 Clathria (Clathria) inhacensis Thomas, 1979
 Clathria (Clathria) intermedia Kirk, 1911
 Clathria (Clathria) irregularis (Burton, 1931)
 Clathria (Clathria) juncea Burton, 1931
 Clathria (Clathria) koreana Sim & Lee, 1998
 Clathria (Clathria) kylista Hooper & Lévi, 1993
 Clathria (Clathria) laevigata Lambe, 1893
 Clathria (Clathria) lipochela Burton, 1932
 Clathria (Clathria) lissosclera Bergquist & Fromont, 1988
 Clathria (Clathria) lobata Vosmaer, 1880
 Clathria (Clathria) macroisochela Lévi, 1993
 Clathria (Clathria) maeandrina Ridley, 1884
 Clathria (Clathria) marissuperi Pulitzer-Finali, 1983
 Clathria (Clathria) menoui Hooper & Lévi, 1993
 Clathria (Clathria) meyeri (Bowerbank, 1877)
 Clathria (Clathria) microchela (Stephens, 1916)
 Clathria (Clathria) microxa Desqueyroux, 1972
 Clathria (Clathria) mortenseni (Brøndsted, 1924)
 Clathria (Clathria) mosulpia Sim & Byeon, 1989
 Clathria (Clathria) multiformis Samaai, Pillay & Janson, 2019
 Clathria (Clathria) multipes Hallmann, 1912
 Clathria (Clathria) murphyi Hooper, 1996
 Clathria (Clathria) nicoleae Vieira de Barros, Santos & Pinheiro, 2013
 Clathria (Clathria) noarlungae Hooper, 1996
 Clathria (Clathria) obliqua (George & Wilson, 1919)
 Clathria (Clathria) oculata Burton, 1933
 Clathria (Clathria) omegiensis Samaai & Gibbons, 2005
 Clathria (Clathria) oxyphila (Hallmann, 1912)
 Clathria (Clathria) pachystyla Lévi, 1963
 Clathria (Clathria) papillosa Thiele, 1905
 Clathria (Clathria) partita Hallmann, 1912
 Clathria (Clathria) parva Lévi, 1963
 Clathria (Clathria) paucispicula (Burton, 1932)
 Clathria (Clathria) pauper Brøndsted, 1927
 Clathria (Clathria) pellicula Whitelegge, 1897
 Clathria (Clathria) perforata (Lendenfeld, 1887)
 Clathria (Clathria) piniformis (Carter, 1885)
 Clathria (Clathria) plurityla Pulitzer-Finali, 1983
 Clathria (Clathria) priestleyae Goodwin, Berman & Hendry, 2019
 Clathria (Clathria) productitoxa (Hoshino, 1981)
 Clathria (Clathria) prolifera (Ellis & Solander, 1786)
 Clathria (Clathria) pyramidalis (Brøndsted, 1924)
 Clathria (Clathria) ramsayiensis Samaai, Pillay & Janson, 2019
 Clathria (Clathria) ramus Kang & Kim, 2018
 Clathria (Clathria) raphanus (Lamarck, 1814)
 Clathria (Clathria) rectangulosa Schmidt, 1870
 Clathria (Clathria) rhaphidotoxa Stephens, 1915
 Clathria (Clathria) rubens (Lendenfeld, 1888)
 Clathria (Clathria) sarai Hooper, 1996
 Clathria (Clathria) saraspinifera Hooper, 1996
 Clathria (Clathria) sartaginula (Lamarck, 1814)
 Clathria (Clathria) shirahama Tanita, 1977
 Clathria (Clathria) sohuksanensis Kim & Sim, 2006
 Clathria (Clathria) spinispicula Tanita, 1968
 Clathria (Clathria) spongodes Dendy, 1922
 Clathria (Clathria) squalorum Wiedenmayer in Hooper & Wiedenmayer, 1994
 Clathria (Clathria) striata Whitelegge, 1907
 Clathria (Clathria) stromnessa Goodwin, Brewin & Brickle, 2012
 Clathria (Clathria) terraenovae Dendy, 1924
 Clathria (Clathria) tortuosa Uriz, 1988
 Clathria (Clathria) toxipraedita Topsent, 1913
 Clathria (Clathria) toxistricta Topsent, 1925
 Clathria (Clathria) toxistyla (Sarà, 1959)
 Clathria (Clathria) toxivaria (Sarà, 1959)
 Clathria (Clathria) transiens Hallmann, 1912
 Clathria (Clathria) typica sensu Kirkpatrick, 1903
 Clathria (Clathria) ulmus Vosmaer, 1880
 Clathria (Clathria) unica Cuartas, 1992
 Clathria (Clathria) vasiformis (de Laubenfels, 1953)
 Clathria (Clathria) whiteleggii Dendy, 1922
 Clathria (Clathria) wilsoni Wiedenmayer, 1989
 Clathria (Clathria) zoanthifera Lévi, 1963
Subgenus Clathria (Cornulotrocha) Topsent, 1927
 Clathria (Cornulotrocha) cheliglomerata Van Soest, Beglinger & De Voogd, 2013
 Clathria (Cornulotrocha) cheliradians (Topsent, 1927)
 Clathria (Cornulotrocha) polita (Ridley, 1881)
 Clathria (Cornulotrocha) rosetafiordica Hajdu, Desqueyroux-Faúndez & Willenz, 2006
Subgenus Clathria (Dendrocia) Hallmann, 1920
 Clathria (Dendrocia) curvichela (Hallmann, 1912)
 Clathria (Dendrocia) dura Whitelegge, 1901
 Clathria (Dendrocia) elegantula Ridley & Dendy, 1886
 Clathria (Dendrocia) imperfecta Dendy, 1896
 Clathria (Dendrocia) myxilloides Dendy, 1896
 Clathria (Dendrocia) pyramida Lendenfeld, 1888
 Clathria (Dendrocia) scabida (Carter, 1885)
 Clathria (Dendrocia) tuberculata (Burton, 1934)
Subgenus Clathria (Isociella) Hallmann, 1920
 Clathria (Isociella) eccentrica (Burton, 1934)
 Clathria (Isociella) incrustans Bergquist, 1961
 Clathria (Isociella) macropora Lendenfeld, 1888
 Clathria (Isociella) oudekraalensis Samaai & Gibbons, 2005
 Clathria (Isociella) selachia Hooper, 1996
 Clathria (Isociella) skia Hooper, 1996
Subgenus Clathria (Microciona) Bowerbank, 1862
 Clathria (Microciona) acarnoides Van Soest, Meesters & Becking, 2014
 Clathria (Microciona) aceratoobtusa (Carter, 1887)
 Clathria (Microciona) achelata Sandes & Pinheiro, 2016
 Clathria (Microciona) aculeofila Aguirre, Hooker, Willenz & Hajdu, 2011
 Clathria (Microciona) adioristica (de Laubenfels, 1953)
 Clathria (Microciona) affinis (Carter, 1880)
 Clathria (Microciona) africana (Lévi, 1956)
 Clathria (Microciona) anancora (Topsent, 1904)
 Clathria (Microciona) angularis (Sarà & Siribelli, 1960)
 Clathria (Microciona) anonyma (Burton, 1959)
 Clathria (Microciona) antarctica (Topsent, 1917)
 Clathria (Microciona) armata (Bowerbank, 1862)
 Clathria (Microciona) ascendens (Cabioch, 1968)
 Clathria (Microciona) ascensionis Van Soest, Beglinger & De Voogd, 2013
 Clathria (Microciona) assimilis Topsent, 1925
 Clathria (Microciona) atoxa Topsent, 1928
 Clathria (Microciona) atrasanguinea (Bowerbank, 1862)
 Clathria (Microciona) aurea Van Soest, Beglinger & De Voogd, 2013
 Clathria (Microciona) basifixa (Topsent, 1913)
 Clathria (Microciona) bicleistochelifera Van Soest, Beglinger & De Voogd, 2013
 Clathria (Microciona) bitoxa (Burton, 1930)
 Clathria (Microciona) boavistae Van Soest, Beglinger & De Voogd, 2013
 Clathria (Microciona) brepha (Laubenfels, 1930)
 Clathria (Microciona) bulboretorta (Carter, 1880)
 Clathria (Microciona) bulbotoxa van Soest, 1984
 Clathria (Microciona) calla (Laubenfels, 1934)
 Clathria (Microciona) calloides Van Soest, Beglinger & De Voogd, 2013
 Clathria (Microciona) campecheae Hooper, 1996
 Clathria (Microciona) cancapseptima Van Soest, Beglinger & De Voogd, 2013
 Clathria (Microciona) capverdensis Van Soest, Beglinger & De Voogd, 2013
 Clathria (Microciona) cheeki Goodwin, Jones, Neely & Brickle, 2016
 Clathria (Microciona) claudei Hooper, 1996
 Clathria (Microciona) cleistochela Topsent, 1925
 Clathria (Microciona) coccinea (Bergquist, 1961)
 Clathria (Microciona) conchicola Van Soest, Beglinger & De Voogd, 2013
 Clathria (Microciona) crassitoxa Santos & Pinheiro, 2014
 Clathria (Microciona) ctenichela (Alander, 1942)
 Clathria (Microciona) danielae Cavalcanti, Santos & Pinheiro, 2019
 Clathria (Microciona) dendyi (Bergquist & Fromont, 1988)
 Clathria (Microciona) densa (Burton, 1959)
 Clathria (Microciona) dianae (Schmidt, 1875)
 Clathria (Microciona) ditoxa (Stephens, 1916)
 Clathria (Microciona) duplex Sarà, 1958
 Clathria (Microciona) echinata (Alcolado, 1984)
 Clathria (Microciona) elliptichela (Alander, 1942)
 Clathria (Microciona) fallax (Bowerbank, 1866)
 Clathria (Microciona) ferrea (de Laubenfels, 1936)
 Clathria (Microciona) frogeti (Vacelet, 1969)
 Clathria (Microciona) gorgadensis Van Soest, Beglinger & De Voogd, 2013
 Clathria (Microciona) gradalis Topsent, 1925
 Clathria (Microciona) grisea (Hentschel, 1911)
 Clathria (Microciona) haematodes (de Laubenfels, 1957)
 Clathria (Microciona) haplotoxa (Topsent, 1928)
 Clathria (Microciona) hentscheli Hooper, 1996
 Clathria (Microciona) heterotoxa (Hentschel, 1929)
 Clathria (Microciona) hymedesmioides van Soest, 1984
 Clathria (Microciona) illawarrae Hooper, 1996
 Clathria (Microciona) ixauda (Lévi, 1969)
 Clathria (Microciona) laevis (Bowerbank, 1866)
 Clathria (Microciona) lajorei (de Laubenfels, 1954)
 Clathria (Microciona) larae Cavalcanti, Santos & Pinheiro, 2019
 Clathria (Microciona) leighensis Hooper, 1996
 Clathria (Microciona) levii (Sarà & Siribelli, 1960)
 Clathria (Microciona) lizardensis Hooper, 1996
 Clathria (Microciona) longistyla (Burton, 1959)
 Clathria (Microciona) macrochela (Lévi, 1960)
 Clathria (Microciona) matthewsi Goodwin, Brewin & Brickle, 2012
 Clathria (Microciona) microjoanna (de Laubenfels, 1930)
 Clathria (Microciona) micronesia (de Laubenfels, 1954)
 Clathria (Microciona) microxea (Vacelet & Vasseur, 1971)
 Clathria (Microciona) mima (de Laubenfels, 1954)
 Clathria (Microciona) moraesi Cavalcanti, Santos & Pinheiro, 2019
 Clathria (Microciona) mytilifila Hajdu, Desqueyroux-Faúndez, Carvalho, Lôbo-Hajdu & Willenz, 2013
 Clathria (Microciona) namibiensis (Uriz, 1984)
 Clathria (Microciona) nisiae Cavalcanti, Santos & Pinheiro, 2019
 Clathria (Microciona) normani (Burton, 1930)
 Clathria (Microciona) novaezealandiae (Brøndsted, 1924)
 Clathria (Microciona) osismica (Cabioch, 1968)
 Clathria (Microciona) parthena (de Laubenfels, 1930)
 Clathria (Microciona) pennata (Lambe, 1895)
 Clathria (Microciona) plinthina (de Laubenfels, 1954)
 Clathria (Microciona) poecilosclera (Sarà & Siribelli, 1960)
 Clathria (Microciona) primitiva (Koltun, 1955)
 Clathria (Microciona) rarispinosa (Hechtel, 1965)
 Clathria (Microciona) rhopalophora (Hentschel, 1912)
 Clathria (Microciona) richmondi Hooper, Kelly & Kennedy, 2000
 Clathria (Microciona) saoensis Gastaldi, De Paula, Narvarte, Lôbo-Hajdu & Hajdu, 2018
 Clathria (Microciona) scotti (Dendy, 1924)
 Clathria (Microciona) sigmoidea (Cuartas, 1992)
 Clathria (Microciona) simae Hooper, 1996
 Clathria (Microciona) similis (Thiele, 1903)
 Clathria (Microciona) snelliusae Van Soest, 2017
 Clathria (Microciona) spinarcus (Carter & Hope, 1889)
 Clathria (Microciona) spinatoxa (Hoshino, 1981)
 Clathria (Microciona) spinosa (Wilson, 1902)
 Clathria (Microciona) spongigartina (Laubenfels, 1930)
 Clathria (Microciona) stephensae Hooper, 1996
 Clathria (Microciona) strepsitoxa (Hope, 1889)
 Clathria (Microciona) tenebrosa Goodwin, Jones, Neely & Brickle, 2016
 Clathria (Microciona) tenuis (Stephens, 1915)
 Clathria (Microciona) tenuissima (Stephens, 1916)
 Clathria (Microciona) tetrastyla (Hentschel, 1912)
 Clathria (Microciona) thielei (Hentschel, 1912)
 Clathria (Microciona) toximajor Topsent, 1925
 Clathria (Microciona) toxirecta (Sarà & Siribelli, 1960)
 Clathria (Microciona) toxitenuis Topsent, 1925
 Clathria (Microciona) trairae Santos & Pinheiro, 2014
 Clathria (Microciona) tunisiae Hooper, 1996
 Clathria (Microciona) vacelettia Hooper, 1996
Subgenus Clathria (Paresperia) Burton, 1930
 Clathria (Paresperia) anchorata (Carter, 1874)
Subgenus Clathria (Thalysias) Duchassaing & Michelotti, 1864
 Clathria (Thalysias) abietina (Lamarck, 1814)
 Clathria (Thalysias) amabilis (Thiele, 1905)
 Clathria (Thalysias) amirantiensis Hooper, 1996
 Clathria (Thalysias) anomala (Burton, 1933)
 Clathria (Thalysias) aphylla Hooper, 1996
 Clathria (Thalysias) araiosa Hooper & Lévi, 1993
 Clathria (Thalysias) arborescens (Ridley, 1884)
 Clathria (Thalysias) arteria (de Laubenfels, 1954)
 Clathria (Thalysias) aruensis (Hentschel, 1912)
 Clathria (Thalysias) basiarenacea (Boury-Esnault, 1973)
 Clathria (Thalysias) bitoxifera (Koltun, 1970)
 Clathria (Thalysias) cactiformis (Lamarck, 1814)
 Clathria (Thalysias) calochela (Hentschel, 1912)
 Clathria (Thalysias) cancellaria (Lamarck, 1814)
 Clathria (Thalysias) cervicornis (Thiele, 1903)
 Clathria (Thalysias) chelosigmoidea Zea, Rodriguez & Martinez, 2014
 Clathria (Thalysias) collosclera van Soest, 2009
 Clathria (Thalysias) complanata Van Soest, 2017
 Clathria (Thalysias) coppingeri Ridley, 1884
 Clathria (Thalysias) coralliophila (Thiele, 1903)
 Clathria (Thalysias) coriocrassus (Bergquist & Fromont, 1988)
 Clathria (Thalysias) corneolia Hooper & Lévi, 1993
 Clathria (Thalysias) costifera Hallmann, 1912
 Clathria (Thalysias) craspedia Hooper, 1996
 Clathria (Thalysias) cratitia (Esper, 1797)
 Clathria (Thalysias) cullingworthi Burton, 1931
 Clathria (Thalysias) curacaoensis Arndt, 1927
 Clathria (Thalysias) darwinensis Hooper, 1996
 Clathria (Thalysias) delaubenfelsi (Lévi, 1963)
 Clathria (Thalysias) distincta (Thiele, 1903)
 Clathria (Thalysias) dubia (Kirkpatrick, 1900)
 Clathria (Thalysias) encrusta Kumar, 1925
 Clathria (Thalysias) erecta (Thiele, 1899)
 Clathria (Thalysias) eurypa (Laubenfels, 1954)
 Clathria (Thalysias) fascicularis Topsent, 1889
 Clathria (Thalysias) fasciculata Wilson, 1925
 Clathria (Thalysias) filifera (Ridley & Dendy, 1886)
 Clathria (Thalysias) flabellifera Hooper & Lévi, 1993
 Clathria (Thalysias) fusterna Hooper, 1996
 Clathria (Thalysias) hallmanni Hooper, 1996
 Clathria (Thalysias) hartmani (Simpson, 1966)
 Clathria (Thalysias) hermicola van Soest, Kaiser & Van Syoc, 2011
 Clathria (Thalysias) hesperia Hooper, 1996
 Clathria (Thalysias) hirsuta Hooper & Lévi, 1993
 Clathria (Thalysias) hooperi Samaai & Gibbons, 2005
 Clathria (Thalysias) isodictyoides (van Soest, 1984)
 Clathria (Thalysias) jolicoeuri (Topsent, 1892)
 Clathria (Thalysias) juniperina (Lamarck, 1814)
 Clathria (Thalysias) kieschnicki Hooper in Hooper & Wiedenmayer, 1994
 Clathria (Thalysias) kilauea (Laubenfels, 1951)
 Clathria (Thalysias) koltuni Hooper in Hooper & Wiedenmayer, 1994
 Clathria (Thalysias) lambda (Lévi, 1958)
 Clathria (Thalysias) lematolae Hooper, 1996
 Clathria (Thalysias) lendenfeldi Ridley & Dendy, 1886
 Clathria (Thalysias) linda (de Laubenfels, 1954)
 Clathria (Thalysias) lissoclada (Burton, 1934)
 Clathria (Thalysias) longitoxa (Hentschel, 1912)
 Clathria (Thalysias) major Hentschel, 1912
 Clathria (Thalysias) maunaloa (de Laubenfels, 1951)
 Clathria (Thalysias) mauriceburtoni Van Soest & Hooper, 2020
 Clathria (Thalysias) membranacea (Thiele, 1905)
 Clathria (Thalysias) michaelseni (Hentschel, 1911)
 Clathria (Thalysias) micropunctata (Burton & Rao, 1932)
 Clathria (Thalysias) minuta (van Soest, 1984)
 Clathria (Thalysias) minutoides Van Soest, Beglinger & De Voogd, 2013
 Clathria (Thalysias) mutabilis (Topsent, 1897)
 Clathria (Thalysias) naikaiensis (Hoshino, 1981)
 Clathria (Thalysias) nervosa (Lévi, 1963)
 Clathria (Thalysias) nuda Hentschel, 1912
 †Clathria (Thalysias) ongulensis (Hoshino, 1977) 
 Clathria (Thalysias) opalina Zea, Rodriguez & Martinez, 2014
 Clathria (Thalysias) orientalis (Brøndsted, 1934)
 Clathria (Thalysias) originalis (de Laubenfels, 1930)
 Clathria (Thalysias) oxeota (van Soest, 1984)
 Clathria (Thalysias) oxitoxa Lévi, 1963
 Clathria (Thalysias) phorbasiformis Hooper, 1996
 Clathria (Thalysias) placenta (Lamarck, 1814)
 Clathria (Thalysias) procera (Ridley, 1884)
 Clathria (Thalysias) ramosa (Kieschnick, 1896)
 Clathria (Thalysias) reinwardti Vosmaer, 1880
 Clathria (Thalysias) repens Galindo, Hooper & Pinheiro, 2014
 Clathria (Thalysias) ridleyi (Lindgren, 1897)
 Clathria (Thalysias) robusta (Dendy, 1922)
 Clathria (Thalysias) rubispina (Lamarck, 1814)
 Clathria (Thalysias) rubra (Lendenfeld, 1888)
 Clathria (Thalysias) spinifera (Lindgren, 1897)
 Clathria (Thalysias) styloprothesis Hooper, 1996
 Clathria (Thalysias) sulfocleistochela Zea, Rodriguez & Martinez, 2014
 Clathria (Thalysias) tingens Hooper, 1996
 Clathria (Thalysias) topsenti (Thiele, 1899)
 Clathria (Thalysias) toxifera (Hentschel, 1912)
 Clathria (Thalysias) vacata Van Soest, Beglinger & De Voogd, 2013
 Clathria (Thalysias) venosa (Alcolado, 1984)
 Clathria (Thalysias) virgultosa (Esper, 1806)
 Clathria (Thalysias) vulpina (Lamarck, 1814)
 Clathria (Thalysias) wesselensis Hooper, 1996
 Clathria (Thalysias) zeai Van Soest, 2017
Subgenus Clathria (Wilsonella) Carter, 1885
 Clathria (Wilsonella) abrolhosensis Hooper, 1996
 Clathria (Wilsonella) australiensis Carter, 1885
 Clathria (Wilsonella) cercidochela (Vacelet & Vasseur, 1971)
 Clathria (Wilsonella) claviformis Hentschel, 1912
 Clathria (Wilsonella) ensiae Hooper, 1996
 Clathria (Wilsonella) foraminifera (Burton & Rao, 1932)
 Clathria (Wilsonella) guettardi (Topsent, 1933)
 Clathria (Wilsonella) lindgreni Hooper, 1996
 Clathria (Wilsonella) litos Hooper & Lévi, 1993
 Clathria (Wilsonella) mixta Hentschel, 1912
 Clathria (Wilsonella) nigra (Boury-Esnault, 1973)
 Clathria (Wilsonella) pseudonapya (de Laubenfels, 1930)
 Clathria (Wilsonella) reticulata (Lendenfeld, 1888)
 Clathria (Wilsonella) rugosa Hooper & Lévi, 1993
 Clathria (Wilsonella) tuberosa (Bowerbank, 1875)
Subgenus unassigned
 Clathria carteri Topsent, 1889
 Clathria compressa (Bowerbank, 1875)
 Clathria dichela sensu Vacelet, Vasseur & Lévi, 1976
 Clathria frondosa (Pallas, 1766)
 Clathria granulata (Keller, 1889)
 Clathria schmitti (de Laubenfels, 1942)
 Clathria surculosa (Esper, 1794)

References

Poecilosclerida
Sponge genera